Dinendra Nath Bhattacharya (1915-1980) also known as Dinen Bhattacharya  was an Indian politician. He was elected to the Lok Sabha, the lower house of the Parliament of India from the Sreerampur constituency of West Bengal in 1962 as a member of the Communist Party of India  and in 1971,1977 and 1980 as a member of the Communist Party of India (Marxist).

References

External links
 Official biographical sketch in Parliament of India website

Communist Party of India (Marxist) politicians from West Bengal
Communist Party of India politicians from West Bengal
Lok Sabha members from West Bengal
India MPs 1962–1967
India MPs 1971–1977
India MPs 1977–1979
India MPs 1980–1984
1915 births
1980 deaths
People from Hooghly district